Thirisoolam is a 1979 Indian Tamil-language film directed by K. Vijayan. It has Sivaji Ganesan playing triple roles. It was promoted as Ganesan's 200th film in a lead role. It broke all the box office records till that date and crossed 9 crore mark. It was the first film to cross 900 houseful shows in Chennai and 375 houseful shows in Madurai. The film become a silver jubilee film, running for over 175 days  in 8 theatres.  It is a remake of the Kannada film Shankar Guru (1978).

Plot 
Rajasekaran is an upright businessman whose associates are involved in shady deals. During an argument over such a deal, a scuffle ensues and Rajasekharan accidentally shoots one of his associates dead. Fleeing from the police, he loses contact with his pregnant wife Sumathi.

Many years later, Sumathi is now living with her son Shankar in Delhi, while Rajasekaran is a rich estate owner in Kashmir. Rajasekaran's niece Nalini encounters Shankar in Delhi and recommends him to manage her uncle's estate in Kashmir. Also arriving in Kashmir for a romantic quest with a rich girl Malathy is Guru, a look-alike of Shankar, who is later revealed as his twin brother. Through Shankar, Rajasekaran finally manages to establish contact with his long-lost wife Sumathi and is overwhelmed with joy.

However, before he can meet Sumathi, trouble arrives in the form of Rajasekaran's erstwhile crooked partners headed by M. N. Nambiar, who are after a valuable necklace stolen from a temple in Delhi, which they believe is now in Rajasekaran's possession. The partners kidnap Sumathi and imprison and torture Rajasekaran, and it is up to Shankar and Guru to rescue and re-unite their father and mother.

Cast 
Sivaji Ganesan as Rajashekharan/Shankar/Guru
K. R. Vijaya as Sumathi
Sripriya as Malathy
Reena as Nalini
M. N. Nambiar as Chakravarthi
Major Sundarrajan as Guru's foster father
Thengai Srinivasan as Ganesh
V. K. Ramasamy as Malathy's Grandfather
S. V. Ramadas as Premkumar
Jai Ganesh as Divakar, Chakravarthi's son
Pushpalatha as Dr. Prema

Production 
Thirisoolam was promoted as Ganesan's 200th film in a leading role. Ganesan's home, Annai Illam, features in the film.

Soundtrack 
The music was composed by M. S. Viswanathan, with lyrics by Kannadasan.

Reception 
P. S. M. of Kalki praised Ganesan's performance, but not the film itself. It ran in more than 20 theatres for 100 days and crossed silver jubilee in 8 theatres.

Legacy
Thirisoolam is included alongside other Ganesan-starring films in the compilation DVD 8th Ulaga Adhisayam Sivaji.

References

External links 
 

1979 films
Films scored by M. S. Viswanathan
1970s Tamil-language films
Tamil remakes of Kannada films
Twins in Indian films
Films set in Delhi
Films set in Jammu and Kashmir
Films directed by K. Vijayan